The Sheppard-Worlock Statue is a statue located in Liverpool, England, commemorating two of the city's former bishops; David Sheppard (the Anglican Bishop of Liverpool), and Derek Worlock (the Roman Catholic Archbishop of Liverpool). It was designed by Stephen Broadbent.

Origins and design
The statue was commissioned in 2005 by The Liverpool Echo Newspaper and paid for by the people of Liverpool, to mark the life and work of Bishop David Sheppard and Archbishop Derek Worlock.

The aim of the statue was to create a lasting memorial to the work of the two religious leaders whose presence towered over Liverpool during the dark days of the 1970s and 1980s.  Despite coming from two different churches in a city which, over the years, has seen deep religious divisions, Bishop David and Archbishop Derek together, and working with other religious leaders, were a uniting force.

Sculptor Stephen Broadbent won the commission with his design of two 15 ft bronze “doors” decorated with symbols and newspaper headlines from the two men's lives and ministry.  Through the open doors the viewer can see both cathedrals signifying the unity the churchmen, affectionately dubbed “fish and chips” as they were always together and never out of the papers, strove to achieve.

Liverpool council has now accepted the statue as a gift to the city and people of Liverpool.

Unveiling
The church leaders of all the mainstream Christian denominations, led a procession of up to 3,000 Christians through Liverpool on Sunday 11 May on a Walk of Witness.  They took it in turns to read a specially-created memorial liturgy as they walked from the Metropolitan Cathedral to Liverpool Cathedral.  Half-way between the two cathedrals on Hope Street, they stopped to unveil a 15 ft bronze statue designed by sculptor Stephen Broadbent honouring the work of Bishop David Sheppard and Archbishop Derek Worlock.

The memorial liturgy read as follows:

References 

Outdoor sculptures in England
Tourist attractions in Liverpool
2005 sculptures
Bronze sculptures in the United Kingdom